Ishaya Rizi Bamaiyi,  (born 21 September 1949) is a retired Nigerian Army Lieutenant general and former Chief of Army Staff. His older brother was Major General Musa Bamaiyi, former Head of the National Drug Law Enforcement Agency (NDLEA).

Background and education
He was born in Kebbi State Northwestern Nigeria. He was Short serviced commissioned into the Nigerian Army infantry Corps in 1968 as a member of SSC 4 he attended the following courses: 
 Nigerian Defence Academy Kaduna, 1968
 Young Officers infantry Course 1971
 Advanced Infantry Company Commanders Course, UK, 1976
 Command and General Staff College United States 1981-82
 International Management Course, USA, 1986
 Snr. Executive Course, National Institute for Policy and Strategic Studies, Kuru, Jos. 1992

Military career
General Bamaiyi prior to becoming the Chief of Army Staff held the following posts:

 Adjutant. 182 Infantry Battalion. 1968-70
 Commanding Officer 70 Infantry Battalion, 1972–77
 Directing Staff, Command and Staff College, Jaji, 1982–84 
 Commander. 9 Mechanised Brigade, 1986–90
 Commander, Brigade of Guards, 1990–92
 Director Training, Army Headquarters, Department of Operations,  1992–93
 Commander. Lagos Garrison Command. 1993-96
General Bamaiyi was appointed Chief of Army Staff (COAS) in March 1996 by General Sanni Abacha. He served as COAS for 3 years until his retirement in May 1999.

Controversy

Attempted murder allegations
On 10 December 1999 Gen. Bamaiya was charged with the attempted Murder of Guardian Newspaper Publisher Alex Ibru on 2 February 1996 alongside the former Chief Security Officer (CSO) to Gen Abacha, Major Hamza al-Mustapha, and others by the Lagos state government.
Bamaiyi who served under the military administration of late General Sani Abacha was arraigned by the Lagos state government of the attempted murder of publisher of the Guardian newspaper, Mr. Alex Ibru, and an eminent Delta state indigene, Mr. Isaac Porbeni. 
He was discharged and acquitted on 2 April 2008 of any wrongdoing in the saga after nine years in detention.

Feud with Musa Bamaiyi
Ishaya and his older brother, Musa Bamaiyi reportedly feuded for years leading to Musa seeking  redress from the Human Rights Violation Investigation Commission (HRVIC) Panel, headed by Justice Chukwudifu Oputa.

References

1949 births
Living people
Nigerian Army Brigade of Guards Commanders
Nigerian Army officers
Nigerian Defence Academy alumni
Chiefs of Army Staff (Nigeria)
Members of the Nigerian National Institute of Policy and Strategic Studies
Nigerian generals
Instructors at the Nigerian Armed Forces Command and Staff College